Breitenfeld, subtitled "Triumph of the Swedish System", is a board wargame published by Simulations Publications Inc. (SPI) in 1976 that simulates the 1642 Battle of Breitenfeld during the Thirty Years' War. Breitenfeld was a free game that appeared in Strategy & Tactics, designed to promote SPI's soon-to-be-launched wargame Thirty Years War. Breitenfeld proved popular and was also published  as part of SPI's "folio" series of games.

Background
From 1618 to 1648, a series of religious conflicts between Protestant and Catholic states broke out in Europe, killing an estimated 4 to 8 million soldiers and civilians. In early November 1642, a Swedish army besieged the city of Leipzig, but decamped at the approach of a large Imperial army. The Swedes retreated in good order and entrenched near the town of Breitenfeld to await the Imperial attack.

Description
Breitenfeld is a two-player wargame in which one player controls the Swedes, and the other player controls the Imperial army.

Components
The game includes:
22" x 17" paper hex grid map scaled at 175 m (190 yd) per hex
100 die-cut counters
Rulesheet

Gameplay
Breitenfeld uses the same "I Go, You Go" alternating system of turns originally used in SPI's 1971 game, Napoleon at Waterloo:
The first player moves all units desired, and engages in combat.
The second player then has the same opportunity.
This completes one game turn, which represents 45 minutes of game time.

However, in a change from the Napoleon at Waterloo rules: 
zones of control are "rigid" but not "sticky": a unit moving adjacent to an enemy unit can continue to move onwards without stopping, but if the unit chooses to stop adjacent to an enemy, combat must ensue.
artillery can fire and be captured, but cannot be moved.
Leader counters add their rating to a unit's combat strength and can help rally disrupted units.
Each game specifies a number of losses that an army must suffer before "demoralization" is reached. If an army is demoralized, it cannot fight, and its movement is increased (simulating headlong retreat).
A unit that is disrupted as a result of combat cannot fight; the player must roll a die at the start of the next turn to see if the unit can "shake off" the disruption and return to normal. A leader in the same hex will give a bonus to this die roll.

Publication history
After the success of SPI's first quadrigame, Blue & Gray, released in May 1975,  the company quickly produced more quadrigames, including Blue & Gray II, Napoleon at War, and Modern Battles. Their next quadrigame, Thirty Years War, was to be published in May 1976. In order to promote this launch, the March 1976 issue of Strategy & Tactics featured an article by Albert Nofi about the war's historical background. Accompanying the article was a free pull-out game designed by Jay Nelson titled Breitenfeld. Using the same game system as the four games in Thirty Years War, Breitenfeld was what Nelson characterized as "the flagship game" of Thirty Years War. Breitenfeld proved to be popular, and was also published as a standalone "folio" game (a game packaged in a cardstock folio.)

Reception
In his 1977 book The Comprehensive Guide to Board Wargaming, Nick Palmer called it "a good brisk game using the system of the Thirty Years War Quad."

In The Guide to Simulations/Games for Education and Training, Martin Campion noted that this game "allows the Imperialists to make short work of the Saxons as was done historically." He also recommended that "Since the mapboard of this game contains a nonexistent marshy stream, anyone who plays the game ought to simply ignore that terrain feature."

American game designer Chris Crawford called Breitenfeld "the best of the Thirty Years War Quadrigames, which featured a combat system guaranteed to produce desperate battles." Crawford found the game very balanced, saying, "The battles always ended with each general desperately looking for one last undisrupted regiment to throw into the fight and turn the tide. The resolution of the game was always in doubt up until the last turn, and the ending was always dramatic."

In the 1980 book The Complete Book of Wargames, game designer Jon Freeman noted that at a time when "more and more games require a great investment in time to play to conclusion," the short and simple Breitenfeld "thus serves a need too often neglected in wargaming." Freeman concluded by giving the game an Overall Evaluation of "Good", saying, "It's a simple, fast-moving game suited for the novice or an experienced gamer looking more for fun than for a challenge."  

In Issue 20 of Simulacrum, Tom Johnston and Luc Olivier found that "The game is easy and fun to play. It is well balanced and both sides have a good chance to win. All in all, Breitenfeld is a good game with high replay value."

Other reviews and commentary
 The Wargamer Vol.1 #17
 Panzerfaust #72
 Jagdpanther #13
 Strategist #206

References

Board wargames set in Modern history
Simulations Publications games
Wargames introduced in 1976